John Prizeman (15 November 1930 – 11 July 1992) was a British architect and designer. He was the author of four books.

Early life
John Prizeman was born on 15 November 1930 in Little Bookham, England. He was raised as a Quaker, educated at Leighton Park School and later graduated from the Architectural Association School of Architecture.

Career
Prizeman began his career by working for Felix Samuely. He subsequently established his own practice as an architect and designer. He designed buildings in the United Kingdom and overseas, including "hotel villages, prefabricated houses, housing developments and conversions" as well as "a plastics factory, several restaurants" and art galleries. He also became known for designing kitchens. He donated one of his kitchen sketches to the Victoria & Albert Museum in London.

Prizeman was the author of four books.

Personal life and death
Prizeman married Willow Bentley. They had a son and two daughters. He died on 11 July 1992 in Brighton.

Works
Kitchens (1966)
European Interiors (1970)
Living Rooms (1970) 
Your House (1975)

References

1930 births
1992 deaths
Architects from Somerset
Alumni of the Architectural Association School of Architecture
English designers
English non-fiction writers